Kyrgyzstan participated tn the 2010 Asian Para Games–First Asian Para Games in Guangzhou, China from 13 to 19 December 2010. Athlete from Kyrgyzstan competed one event.

References

Nations at the 2010 Asian Para Games
2010 in Kyrgyzstani sport
Kyrgyzstan at the Asian Games